The 1888 United States presidential election in New York took place on November 6, 1888. All contemporary 38 states were part of the 1888 United States presidential election. Voters chose 36 electors to the Electoral College, which selected the president and vice president.

New York was won by the Republican nominees, former Senator Benjamin Harrison of Indiana and his running mate former Congressman Levi P. Morton of New York. Harrison and Morton defeated the Democratic nominees, incumbent President Grover Cleveland of New York and his running mate former Senator Allen G. Thurman of Ohio. 

Harrison narrowly carried New York State with a plurality of 49.28% of the vote to Cleveland's 48.19%, a victory margin of 1.09%. In a distant third came the Prohibition Party candidate Clinton B. Fisk with 2.29%. 

New York weighed in for this election as less than 2% more Republican than the national average. 

Cleveland's narrow defeat in his home state, losing its 36 electoral votes, ultimately cost him the 1888 election, despite the fact that Cleveland won the nationwide popular vote by nearly a point. Cleveland had narrowly won New York State four years earlier in his initial 1884 presidential campaign, but strong opposition to Cleveland from the corrupt Tammany Hall machine, which held significant influence over New York's politics, helped to narrowly tip the state to Harrison in 1888. Had Cleveland instead won New York, he would have won reelection by seven electoral votes.

Cleveland performed most strongly downstate in the New York City area, where he won New York County, Kings County, Queens County, and Richmond County. Cleveland also won nearby Westchester County and Rockland County. Harrison, however, dominated in much of upstate New York, including a victory in Erie County, home to the city of Buffalo, although Cleveland did manage to win Albany County, home to the state capital of Albany, along with several rural upstate counties.

Results

County Results

See also
 Presidency of Benjamin Harrison
 Grover Cleveland's first term as President of the United States

Notes

References

New York
1888
1888 New York (state) elections